Jesse Michael Bering (born May 6, 1975) is an American psychologist, writer, and academic. He is a professor in Science Communication at the University of Otago (where he serves as Director of the Centre for Science Communication), as well as a frequent contributor to Scientific American, Slate, and Das Magazin (Switzerland). His work has also appeared in New York Magazine, The Guardian, and The New Republic, and has been featured on NPR, the BBC, Playboy Radio and elsewhere.

Early life and education
Bering was born in 1975 in New Jersey, the son of a secular Jewish mother and a non-religious Lutheran father. Having grown up in a highly conservative culture, he reports feeling anxiety about his sexual orientation during his childhood. This experience led to his interest in academic disciplines like human sexuality and the cognitive science of religion. He attended graduate school at the University of Louisiana at Lafayette where he earned his MA degree (1999) under Daniel J. Povinelli. He then transferred to Florida Atlantic University, where he obtained a PhD in developmental psychology (2002). His doctoral advisor was the David F. Bjorklund. Bering's formal academic research is in the area of the cognitive science of religion.

Career and views
Bering is the former director of the Institute of Cognition and Culture at Queen's University Belfast and began his career as a psychology professor at the University of Arkansas. After a period as a full-time writer and professor at Wells College, he took up a science communication post at the University of Otago in 2014.

Bering is notable for his frank and humorous handling of controversial issues in psychological science, especially those dealing with human sexuality. His Scientific American blog, Bering in Mind, was named a 2010 Webby Award Honoree for the Blog-Cultural category by members of The International Academy of Digital Arts and Sciences. He also received the 2010 "Scientist of the Year Award" from the National Organization of Gay and Lesbian Scientists and Technical Professionals (NOGLSTP), an affiliate of the American Association for the Advancement of Science.

He is also a Project Partner in the Oxford University-based 'Explaining Religion' project, a three-year, €2 million project funded by the European Commission.

In his book Perv: The Sexual Deviant in All of Us he argues that paraphilias (so-called "sexual perversions" or "deviancies") should be viewed objectively and judged by the harm they cause, not by moral disgust. His account, in a somewhat light-hearted manner, includes anecdotes of his own experiences as a gay teenager.

Works
 The God Instinct: The Psychology of Souls, Destiny, and the Meaning of Life (W. W. Norton, 2011) – named one of the top 25 books of 2011 by the American Library Association.
 Why is the Penis Shaped Like That? And Other Reflections on Being Human (Farrar, Straus & Giroux, 2012)
 Perv: The Sexual Deviant in All of Us (Farrar, Straus and Giroux, 2013)
 Suicidal: Why We Kill Ourselves (University of Chicago Press, 2018).

References

External links
 
 University of Otago staff profile

1975 births
Living people
21st-century American psychologists
American science writers
Florida Atlantic University alumni
Evolutionary psychologists
University of Arkansas faculty
LGBT Jews
American LGBT scientists
Jewish American academics
American gay writers
Cognitive science of religion
Gay scientists
Academic staff of the University of Otago
LGBT psychologists